Alec Douglas (10 September 1939 – 17 July 2014) was a South African cricketer. He played seven first-class matches for Eastern Province between 1972 and 1974.

References

External links
 

1939 births
2014 deaths
South African cricketers
Eastern Province cricketers
Cricketers from Port Elizabeth